Club 60 is a 2013 Indian comedy drama film produced by Kavee Kumar under the Pulse Media banner and is directed by Sanjay Tripathi. The film features Farooq Sheikh, Sarika Thakur, Raghubir Yadav and Satish Shah in key roles.  The film was Farooq Sheikh's last release before his death on 28 December 2013.

Plot
After the untimely death of their only son, Iqbaal (Ankit Bathla), neurosurgeon, Dr Tariq Sheikh (Farooq Sheikh) and his wife Dr Saira (Sarika) are unable to put the pieces of their broken life together. Tariq suffers from depression, while Saira struggles to cope with her husband's suicidal tendencies. In an attempt to make a fresh start in life and to get rid of the 'nothingness' that haunts them, they shift to Mumbai from Pune. More than the city's distractions, it is their loud neighbor Manubhai (Raghubir Yadav), who manages to kill the deafening silence that plagues them with his somewhat annoying yet adorable antics. Manubhai introduces Tariq to the jovial members of Club 60 – where life begins at 60.

Cast
 Farooq Shaikh as Dr. Tariq Shaikh 
 Sarika Thakur as Dr. Saira Shaikh, Dr. Tariq's wife
 Ankit Bathla as Iqbaal Shaikh, Dr. Tariq's son
 Raghubir Yadav as Manubhai Shah  
 Satish Shah as Jay Mansukhani  
 Tinnu Anand as Ali Zafar aka Jaffar Bhai  
 Sharat Saxena as Commissioner G.S. Dhillon  
 Vineet Kumar as S. K. Sinha  
 Suhasini Mulay as Sarita Mansukhani, Jay Mansukhani’s wife
 Viju Khote as Secretary Patil
 Zarina Wahab as Sharda Sinha, S. K. Sinha’s wife  
Himani Shivpuri as Nalini Doctor  
 Harsh Chhaya as Dr. Anand
 Mona Wasu as Dolly, the lady at night club  
 Geeta Bisht as Rosetta, nurse  
 Shahabb Khan as Clerck  
 Mansi Sadana as Junior Doctor  
 Jaanvi Sangwan as Maya 
 Satish Sharma as Rohit Mansukhani, Jay Mansukhani’s son
 Jitendra Trehan as Girish Mirchandani, Rohit’s father in law
 Ruma Rajni as Surabhi Mansukhani (Nee Mirchandani), Jay Mansukhani’s daughter in law
 Master Meet as Yash Mansukhani, Rohit’s son
 Khushi Awasthi as Kuku Patel
 Alok Chaturvedi as Pandey
 Umakant Rai as Gopal
 Suresh Naik as Sampat
 Amod as Club Manager 
 Beena Kalekar as Club Receptionist

Soundtrack

Reception
The movie was generally appreciated for its script, casting, performances by the lead actors (Farooq Sheikh and Sarika), editing and the music. At the same time, the movie was found wanting in certain aspects such as the background score, screenplay and was also criticized for some of the jokes with heavy sexual innuendo, a predictable second half and a clumsy and overlong climax. Overall, the movie received an average rating of 2.58/5 from critics.

Box office collections
As per Bollywood Hungama website, the lifetime collections of the film was Rs. 4.2 million. The movie completed a run of 100 days in cinemas in April 2014. The director credited word of mouth publicity.

Re-release
PVR Cinemas decided to re-release Club 60 in cinemas again in January 2014 as a tribute to Farooq Sheikh .

References

External links
 

2013 films
2010s Hindi-language films